Higashi Arakawa Dam is a gravity dam located in Tochigi prefecture in Japan. The dam is used for flood control, irrigation, water supply and power production. The catchment area of the dam is 21 km2. The dam impounds about 37  ha of land when full and can store 6100 thousand cubic meters of water. The construction of the dam was started on 1974 and completed in 1990.

References

Dams in Tochigi Prefecture
1990 establishments in Japan